Elaeocarpus grahamii is a species of flowering plant in the family Elaeocarpaceae and is endemic to north-east Queensland. It is a small to medium-sized tree, sometimes coppicing, with elliptic to egg-shaped leaves, flowers with five petals that have a frilled tip, and oval blue fruit.

Description
Elaeocarpus grahamii is a small to medium-sized tree that often forms a coppice. There are about fifteen stamens and the ovary is glabrous.

Taxonomy
Elaeocarpus grahamii was first formally described in 1876 by Ferdinand von Mueller in Fragmenta Phytographiae Australiae from material collected by Eugene Fitzalan near the Daintree River. The specific epithet (grahamii) honours von Mueller's friend, George Graham.

Distribution and habitat
It is restricted to the area between Cape Tribulation and Mission Beach.

Conservation status
This quandong is listed as of "least concern" under the Queensland Government Nature Conservation Act 1992.

References

Oxalidales of Australia
grahamii
Flora of Queensland
Plants described in 1876
Endemic flora of Australia
Taxa named by Ferdinand von Mueller